James Russell Stirling (23 July 1925 – November 2006) was a Scottish professional football centre half who made over 210 appearances in the Football League for Southend United.

References 

1925 births
2006 deaths
Footballers from Airdrie, North Lanarkshire
Scottish footballers
Association football wing halves
English Football League players
AFC Bournemouth players
Southend United F.C. players
Poole Town F.C. players
Newmains United Community F.C. players